Matti Kasvio (20 February 1944 – 21 August 2013) was a Finnish freestyle swimmer. He competed in two events at the 1964 Summer Olympics.

References

External links
 

1944 births
2013 deaths
Finnish male freestyle swimmers
Olympic swimmers of Finland
Swimmers at the 1964 Summer Olympics
Swimmers from Helsinki